The Town of Kersey is a Statutory Town in Weld County, Colorado, United States.  The population was 1,454 at the 2010 United States Census.

History

Elbridge Gerry established a trading post called Fort Gerry on the South Platte River near the present-day town of Kersey, Colorado in the 1830s. He had two Native American wives who helped him run the post. In 1840, Gerry abandoned the site and built a post on the south bank of the river. Gerry is said to be the first white man to settle in what is now Weld County.

A post office called Kersey has been in operation since 1894. A railroad official gave Kersey the maiden name of his mother.

Geography
Kersey is located at  (40.386060, -104.561453).

Demographics

As of the census of 2000, there were 1,389 people, 474 households, and 374 families residing in the town. The racial makeup of the town was 91.43% White, 0.07% African American, 0.29% Native American, 0.79% Asian, 4.75% from other races, and 2.66% from two or more races. Hispanic or Latino of any race were 20.01% of the population.

There were 474 households, out of which 48.1% had children under the age of 18 living with them, 62.4% were married couples living together, 12.2% had a female householder with no husband present, and 20.9% were non-families. 17.1% of all households were made up of individuals, and 7.8% had someone living alone who was 65 years of age or older.  The average household size was 2.93 and the average family size was 3.33.

In the town, the population was spread out, with 34.5% under the age of 18, 8.3% from 18 to 24, 31.0% from 25 to 44, 18.0% from 45 to 64, and 8.2% who were 65 years of age or older.  The median age was 30 years. For every 100 females, there were 96.2 males.  For every 100 females age 18 and over, there were 92.0 males.

The median income for a household in the town was $41,333, and the median income for a family was $45,329. Males had a median income of $31,250 versus $23,148 for females. The per capita income for the town was $16,346.  About 8.1% of families and 8.9% of the population were below the poverty line, including 10.6% of those under age 18 and 6.1% of those age 65 or over.

See also

 List of municipalities in Colorado
 Greeley, CO Metropolitan Statistical Area

References

External links

 

Towns in Weld County, Colorado
Towns in Colorado